Dionysia (1st-century BC), was an ancient Roman dancer-actress. 

Dionysia was evidently a famous stage artist in Ancient Rome, as her name was known enough to be used in public debate. She is one of few female stage artists from antiquity of which there is specific sums of a notably great income, an example used in research that elite actresses in Ancient Rome could earn great amounts on their career. 

In 66 BC, in his speech in favour of Quintus Roscius, Cicero noted that the famous dancer Dionysia earns 200.000 sestertius, which he appears to assume to be a well known fact.  In the critic against the orator Hortensius in 62 BC, his gestures are mockingly compared to that of an actress, Dionysia.

References 

 E. Togo Salmon Conference, E. Togo Salmon Conference 1993 Mcmaster University, Roman Theater and Society: E. Togo Salmon Papers I
 Pat Easterling, Edith Hall: Greek and Roman Actors: Aspects of an Ancient Profession

Ancient actresses
1st-century BC Roman women
1st-century BC Romans
Ancient Roman actors
Ancient Roman theatre practitioners
Ancient Roman dancers